Vasil Barnovi (real surname: Barnaveli, ბარნაველი) (May 22, 1856 – November 4, 1934) was a Georgian writer popular for his historical novels. 

He was born into the family of a priest in the village of Koda in what is now Lower Kartli region, Georgia (then under Imperial Russia). He was educated at the seminaries of Tbilisi and Moscow. Returning to Georgia in 1882, he taught Georgian language and literature in Senaki, Telavi, and Tbilisi. At the same time, he engaged in journalism, studied Georgian folklore, and authored autobiographical stories. He is best known, however, for his contributions to the development of modern Georgian historical prose. His novels – მიმქრალი შარავანდედი (The Faded Halo; 1913), ტრფობა წამებული (The Martyred Love; 1918), ისნის ცისკარი (The Dawn of Isani; 1928) and others – are really psychological novels in a historical setting, intertwining historical themes with folklore and fiction, and political in the measure in which they protest against the Russian rule. Barnovi’s works are characterized by the abstraction of historical episodes and idealization of medieval Georgian heroes.  

He died in Tbilisi and was interred at the Mtatsminda Pantheon at Tbilisi.

References 

Rayfield, Donald (2000), The Literature of Georgia: A History: 2nd edition. Routledge,

External links 
 Selected novels by Vasil Barnovi. Georgian eBooks project, National Parliamentary Library of Georgia. Retrieved on March 29, 2007.
http://www.worldcat.org/identities/lccn-n91-6999/ worldcat/identities- Overview :  Vasil Barnov

1856 births
1934 deaths
Burials at Mtatsminda Pantheon
Historical novelists from Georgia (country)
Burials in Georgia (country)
Male writers from Georgia (country)
19th-century novelists
19th-century male writers
20th-century novelists
20th-century male writers
Novelists from the Russian Empire